Paul Jason Hanley (born 12 November 1977) is a retired professional male tennis player from Australia, specialising in doubles and owning 26 ATP titles in this discipline.

He made the 2005 Wimbledon and 2011 Australian Open finals in mixed doubles, playing with Tatiana Perebiynis and Chan Yung-jan respectively, falling short on both occasions.  His best results came alongside Wayne Arthurs and Kevin Ullyett, with whom Hanley formed long-term doubles partnerships. Hanley has an 8–4 win–loss record on the Australian Davis Cup Team.  The Australian's highest doubles ranking was World Number 5.  His parents, Jay and Judy, co-own a tennis centre, which is one of the main reasons why Hanley pursued a career in the sport.

Grand Slam finals

Mixed doubles: 2 (0–2)

ATP career finals

Doubles: 51 (26–25)

Doubles performance timeline

External links
 
 
 

1977 births
Living people
Australian expatriate sportspeople in England
Australian male tennis players
Olympic tennis players of Australia
People from Sutton, London 
Tennis players from Melbourne
Tennis players at the 2008 Summer Olympics
Tennis players at the 2010 Commonwealth Games
Commonwealth Games gold medallists for Australia
Commonwealth Games silver medallists for Australia
Commonwealth Games medallists in tennis
Medallists at the 2010 Commonwealth Games